Karayar (Qarayar) is a rural locality (a village) in Allaguvatsky Selsoviet, Sterlibashevsky District, Bashkortostan, Russia. The population was 64 as of 2010. There are 2 streets.

Geography 
Karayar is located 28 km southeast of Sterlibashevo (the district's administrative centre) by road. Oktyabrevka is the nearest rural locality.

References 

Rural localities in Sterlibashevsky District